Associação Esportiva Evangélica, better known simply as Evangélica or ASEEV, is a Brazilian football club in the city of Guapó, in the state of Goiás. Until 2018 it was in the city of Paraúna.

History
Founded on August 18, 1981 in the city of Paraúna in the state of Goiás, the club is affiliated to Federação Goiana de Futebol and Currently, the club disputes Campeonato Goiano (Third Division). In 2018, the club moved to the city of Guapó.

Titles
 Campeonato Goiano (Third Division) (2015)

Players

Squad 2021

References 

Association football clubs established in 1981
Football clubs in Goiás